Henri Focillon (7 September 1881 – 3 March 1943) was a French art historian. He was the son of the printmaker Victor-Louis Focillon. He was Director of the Musée des Beaux-Arts in Lyon. Professor of Art History at the University of Lyon, at the Ecole des Beaux-Arts in Lyon, at the Sorbonne, at the Collège de France and then in the United States, where he went into exile and taught at Yale University. A poet, printmaker, and teacher, Focillon trained generations of art historians including George Kubler.  He remains best known for his works on medieval art, most of which were translated into English.

Partial bibliography

 Vie des formes (1934, "The Life of Forms")
 Éloge de la main
 Benvenuto Cellini

Medieval Art
 Art des sculpteurs romans (1932)
 Art d'occident 1 : Moyen Âge roman et gothique
 Art d'occident 2 : Moyen Âge gothique (1938)
 Moyen Age. Survivances et réveils (1943)
 Piero della Francesca (1951)
 L'An mil (1952)

Painting
 La peinture au XIXe et XXe siècles (1927-1928, "Painting in the 19th and 20th Centuries")
 De Callot à Lautrec: Perspectives de l’art français ("From Callot to Lautrec: Perspectives on French Art")

Prints
 Giovanni-Battista Piranesi (1918)

East Asia
 L'art bouddhique (1921, "Buddhist Art")
 Hokusai (1914)

References

French art historians
Academic staff of the University of Lyon
Academic staff of the University of Paris
1881 births
1943 deaths
École Normale Supérieure alumni
French male non-fiction writers
20th-century French male writers